Spencer Weisz (ספנסר וייס; born May 31, 1995) is an American-Israeli professional basketball player for Hapoel Haifa of the Israeli Basketball Premier League. He played college basketball for the Princeton Tigers, completing his college career in the 2016–17 season.

Playing for gold medal-winning Team USA, Weisz was the Most Valuable Player of the Under-18 basketball competition in the 2013 Maccabiah Games. He earned the 2014 Ivy League Men's Basketball Rookie of the Year Award and the 2017 Ivy League Men's Basketball Player of the Year Award, and was a 3-time first or second team All-Ivy selection. During the summer of 2015, he was a member of the Israel national under-20 basketball team at the 2015 FIBA U-20 European Championship.

Early life
Weisz is a native of Florham Park, New Jersey, and is Jewish. He attended Seton Hall Prep.  As a junior, he was first-team All-County. As a senior, The Star-Ledger recognized Weisz as a second-team All-State selection in New Jersey and the Essex County, New Jersey boys' basketball Player of the Year.

College career
Playing for Princeton University, Weisz earned the 2014 Ivy League Men's Basketball Rookie of the Year. On December 7, 2013, he posted his first career double-double with 17 points (including 3-for-3 on three-point field goals) and 10 rebounds against Fairleigh Dickinson. He earned second-team All-Ivy League recognition in 2015 and 2016. As a sophomore, in 2014–15, he was 6th in the Ivy League in 3-point field goal percentage (.408), 7th in 3-point field goals (51), and 8th in scoring (11.6). As a junior, he served as a tri-captain (along with Mike Washington Jr. and Steven Cook) of the 2015–16 team, led the Ivy League in assist-to-turnover ratio (2.8), and was 2nd in the league in assists-per-game (3.9), 4th in assists (113), 6th in 3-point field goals (63), and 8th in defensive rebounds (129).

Going into his senior year, The Sporting News projected him as Ivy League first team, and  Lindy's projected him as Ivy League second team.  As a senior, Weisz led Princeton in rebounds, assists (4.2 per game; 125; 2nd in the league), and steals (1.5 per game; 46; 2nd in the Ivy League), while coming in 2nd in the league in assist-to-turnover ratio (2.6), 5th in 3-point field goals (61) and defensive rebounds (137), and 10th in total rebounds (161). In December 2016, he tied the Princeton single-game record for assists in a game, with 13 against Liberty.  He posted his career high of 26 points in a February 3, 2017, 69–64 victory over Dartmouth.  He served again as a co-captain, and earned Ivy League Men's Basketball Player of the Year recognition. He became the 8th player in Ivy League history to win both the league's Rookie of the Year Award and Player of the Year Award. He was one of two unanimous first-team All-Ivy selections, despite only ranking fourth on Princeton in scoring average. Weisz was included on the National Association of Basketball Coaches Division I All‐District 13 second-team, earned honorable mention on the Associated Press All-America team, and was named to the Jewish Sports Review 2016–17 Men's College Basketball All-American First Team. The 2016–17 Princeton Tigers earned Princeton its first NCAA Division I men's basketball tournament invitation since the 2010–11 team did so.

He became the only player in Princeton career history to amass 1,000 points, 500 rebounds, 300 assists, and 200 3-pointers. He ended his college career 2nd in Princeton history in assists (383), 5th in 3-pointers (209), and 12th in scoring (1,241 points). His 511 career defensive rebounds were 5th in Ivy League history.

Professional career

Hapoel Gilboa Galil (2017–2018)
On August 3, 2017, Weisz started his professional career with Hapoel Gilboa Galil of the Israeli Basketball Premier League, signing a one-year deal with an option for another one. Weisz helped Gilboa Galil reach the 2018 Israeli League Playoffs, where they eventually lost to Hapoel Jerusalem in the Quarterfinals.

Maccabi Ashdod (2018–2019)
On July 19, 2018, Weisz signed with Maccabi Ashdod for the 2018–19 season. On April 10, 2019, Weisz recorded a career-high 27 points, shooting 6-of-9 from three-point range, along with eight rebounds, six assists and three steals, leading Ashdod to a 94–86 win over his former team Hapoel Gilboa Galil. In 26 games played for Ashdod, he averaged 9.0 points, 3.9 rebounds and 3.7 assists per game.

Hapoel Be'er Sheva (2019–21)
On June 21, 2019, Weisz signed a two-year deal with Hapoel Be'er Sheva. Two months later, he was named Be'er Sheva's new team captain, replacing Chanan Colman. On October 21, 2019, Weisz recorded a season-high 21 points, shooting 5-of-8 from three-point range, along with eight assists, scoring the last 13 out of 15 points to give Be'er Sheva an 88–87 win over Hapoel Eilat.

In 2020-21 he averaged 12.3 points, 5.3 rebounds, 3.7 assists, and 1.7 steals (7th in the league) per game. He was 3rd in the league in steals, with 48, and 8th in three-point field goal percentage at .356. He was voted Eurobasket All-Israeli League Honorable Mention.

Hapoel Haifa (2021-present)
On July 6, 2021, Weisz signed with Hapoel Haifa in the Israeli Basketball Premier League.

International play
Weisz was a member of the Under-18 US National team that won the 2013 Maccabiah Games gold medal, along with future NFL player Anthony Firkser, and earned the Most Valuable Player recognition for the tournament. In the final, gold medal game against Team Israel, Weisz scored 19 points, brought down 12 rebounds, and had 11 assists.

During the summer of 2015, Weisz was a starter for the Israel national under-20 basketball team at the 2015 FIBA U-20 European Championship, where Israel finished 10th out of 20 teams.

See also
List of select Jewish basketball players

References

External links
 Weisz at ESPN
 Weisz @ CBS Sports
 Weisz @ IvyLeagueSports.com
 Weisz @ GoPrincetonTigers.com

1995 births
Living people
21st-century American Jews
American expatriate basketball people in Israel
American men's basketball players
Basketball players from New Jersey
Competitors at the 2013 Maccabiah Games
Hapoel Be'er Sheva B.C. players
Hapoel Gilboa Galil Elyon players
Hapoel Haifa B.C. players
Israeli American
Israeli Basketball Premier League players
Jewish American sportspeople
Jewish men's basketball players
Maccabi Ashdod B.C. players
Maccabiah Games medalists in basketball
Maccabiah Games gold medalists for the United States
People from Florham Park, New Jersey
Princeton Tigers men's basketball players
Shooting guards
Small forwards
Sportspeople from Morris County, New Jersey